HMS M22  was a First World War Royal Navy  monitor. Later converted to a minelayer and renamed HMS Medea , she was wrecked whilst being towed for breaking up on 2 January 1939.

Design
Intended as a shore bombardment vessel, M22s primary armament was a single 9.2 inch Mk VI gun removed from the  HMS Gibraltar. In addition to her 9.2 inch gun she also possessed one 12 pounder and one six pound anti-aircraft gun. Due to the shortage of Bolinder diesel engines that equipped her sisters, she was fitted with 2 shaft triple expansion steam engines that allowed a top speed of eleven knots. The monitor's crew consisted of sixty nine officers and men.

Construction
HMS M22 ordered in March, 1915, as part of the War Emergency Programme of ship construction. She was laid down at the Sir Raylton Dixon & Co. Ltd shipyard at Govan in March 1915, launched on 10 June 1915, and completed in August 1915.

World War 1
M22 served within the Mediterranean from September 1915 to December 1918.

Interwar service
After service in the Black Sea from June to September 1919, M22 was towed home and converted to a minelayer in 1920. Renamed HMS Medea on 1 December 1925, she became a training ship in January 1937.

Citations

References
 
 Dittmar, F. J. & Colledge, J. J., "British Warships 1914-1919", (Ian Allan, London, 1972), 

 

M15-class monitors
1915 ships
World War I monitors of the United Kingdom
Royal Navy ship names